Anthony Marc Shalhoub (born October 9, 1953), is an American actor. Known for his performances on stage and screen, he has received various accolades including five Emmy Awards, a Golden Globe Award, six Screen Actors Guild Awards, and a Tony Award.

Shalhoub's breakout role was as Antonio Scarpacci in the NBC sitcom Wings from 1991 to 1997. He later starred as Adrian Monk in the USA Network series Monk from 2002 to 2009 earning three Primetime Emmy Awards for Outstanding Lead Actor in a Comedy Series. For his supporting role as Abe Weissman on Amazon's The Marvelous Mrs. Maisel he won the Primetime Emmy Award for Outstanding Supporting Actor in a Comedy Series. 

Shalhoub has also had a successful film career, with roles in films such as Quick Change (1990), Barton Fink (1991), Big Night (1996), Men in Black (1997), Gattaca (1997), Paulie (1998), The Siege (1998), Galaxy Quest (1999), Spy Kids, Thirteen Ghosts, and The Man Who Wasn't There (all 2001). He has also provided voice work for the Cars franchise (2006–2022), Teenage Mutant Ninja Turtles (2014), and its 2016 sequel.

For his work on Broadway, Shalhoub won the Tony Award for Best Actor in a Musical for his performance as Tewfiq Zakaria in The Band's Visit in 2017. Other Tony-nominated roles were in Conversations with My Father in 1992, Golden Boy in 2013, and Act One in 2014.

Early life and education
Shalhoub, the ninth of 10 children, was born and raised in a Lebanese Maronite household in Green Bay, Wisconsin. His father, Joseph (1912–1991), was from Mount Lebanon while it was still part of the Ottoman Empire and immigrated to the United States as a child after his own parents, Milhelm and Mariam, died during World War I. After immigrating to America, Joe Shalhoub became a meat peddler who drove a refrigerated truck. Joe married Shalhoub's mother, Helen Seroogy (1910-1983), a Lebanese-American. The two met when Joe was taken in to be raised by her family, when both were young.  The Seroogy family operated a candy store that remains a family business. One of Shalhoub's maternal great-great-grandfathers, Abdul Naimy, although Lebanese, was reportedly killed in a dramatic way, being crucified in 1895 during the Hamidian massacres committed against Christian Armenians in the Ottoman Empire. Shalhoub was introduced to acting by an older sister, who put his name forward to be an extra in a high-school production of The King and I.

After graduating from Green Bay East High School, he spent a short time at the University of Wisconsin-Green Bay before participating in the National Student Exchange to the University of Southern Maine where he later transferred and earned a bachelor's degree. He later went on to earn a master's degree from the Yale School of Drama in 1980.

Career

Stage
Shortly after graduating from Yale, Shalhoub moved to Cambridge, Massachusetts, where he spent four seasons with the American Repertory Theater before heading to New York City, where he found work waiting tables. He made his Broadway debut in the 1985 Rita Moreno/Sally Struthers production of The Odd Couple and was nominated for a 1992 Tony Award for his featured role in Conversations with My Father. Shalhoub met his wife, actress Brooke Adams, when they co-starred on Broadway in The Heidi Chronicles. In 1998 Shalhoub starred in The Classic Stage Company's production of Waiting For Godot alongside John Turturro and Christopher Lloyd.

Shalhoub returned in December 2006 to the Off-Broadway Second Stage Theatre, opposite Patricia Heaton for a run of The Scene by Theresa Rebeck. In 2010, he went to Broadway to act as Saunders in a revival version of Lend Me a Tenor in New York at the Music Box Theatre. He was nominated for a 2013 Tony Award for Best Performance by a Featured Actor in a Play for Lincoln Center Theater's production of Golden Boy at the Belasco Theatre. He was nominated for a 2014 Tony Award for Best Performance by a Leading Actor in a Play for Lincoln Center Theater's production of Act One at the Vivian Beaumont Theatre. Shalhoub and his wife appeared in Samuel Beckett's Happy Days in June and July, 2015 in New York City.

He starred in the musical stage adaptation of the film The Band's Visit, in the Off-Broadway Atlantic Theatre Company production. The musical, with music and lyrics by David Yazbek and book by Itamar Moses, ran from November 11, 2016 through December 23, 2016. He reprised his role when the show moved to Broadway where it opened at the Ethel Barrymore Theatre on November 9, 2017. For his performance, he won the 2018 Tony Award for Best Actor in a Musical. He also appeared as Walter Franz in the 2017 Broadway revival of The Price.

Screen roles
After playing several small television and film roles from 1986 to 1991, he landed the role of cab driver Antonio Scarpacci in the sitcom Wings. Shalhoub was pleasantly surprised to land the role after having a guest appearance as a waiter in the second season. He became a regular in the third season. The character's name was kept, but the character's occupation changed to a cab driver. He affected an Italian accent for the role. Shalhoub played the role from 1991 until the series ended in 1997.

In the same time period, Shalhoub played the lead role of physicist Dr. Chester Ray Banton in The X-Files second-season episode "Soft Light", the first episode written by Vince Gilligan. Banton's shadow becomes lethal after Banton gets stuck in a particle accelerator, causing him to accidentally destroy anyone close to him, after which the government imprisons and tortures him in an effort to weaponize his superpower.

Shalhoub's film roles following his Wings breakout included an excitable producer consulted by John Turturro's character in Barton Fink and a fast-talking lawyer in The Man Who Wasn't There (both directed by the Coen brothers), a linguistically unidentified cabby in Quick Change, a Cuban-American businessman in Primary Colors, sleazy alien pawn shop owner Jack Jeebs in the Men in Black films, an attorney in A Civil Action, a widowed father in Thirteen Ghosts, a cameo role in the film Gattaca, and a has-been television star in Galaxy Quest.

He had a co-starring role in the film Big Night, where he played an Italian-speaking chef complete with accent. In 1995 he had a role in the hit NBC sitcom Frasier in the episode "The Focus Group" as an Arab newsstand owner named Manu Habbib. He did voice acting for the 1997 computer game Fallout.

Shalhoub demonstrated his dramatic range in the 1998 big-budget thriller The Siege, where he co-starred alongside Denzel Washington, Annette Bening, and Bruce Willis. His character, FBI Special Agent Frank Haddad, also a Lebanese American, suffered discrimination after terrorist attacks in New York City. He returned to series television in 1999, this time in a lead role on Stark Raving Mad, opposite Neil Patrick Harris. The show failed to attract an audience and NBC canceled the series in 2000.

Monk
After a three-year absence from the small screen, Shalhoub starred in another TV series, Monk. Airing on the USA Network, the series featured Shalhoub as Adrian Monk, a detective with obsessive-compulsive disorder. He was nominated for an Emmy Award for Outstanding Lead Actor in a Comedy Series in eight consecutive years from 2003 to 2010, winning in 2003, 2005, and 2006. He also took the Golden Globe award for Best Performance by an Actor in a Television Series – Musical or Comedy in 2003. In May 2020, NBC's Peacock streaming service posted a series of videos on YouTube during the COVID-19 pandemic, entitled the "At-Home Variety Show". Among them was a Monk short entitled "Mr. Monk Shelters in Place", featuring Shalhoub and his co-stars Traylor Howard, Ted Levine, and Jason Gray-Stanford, showing how their characters were coping with the pandemic.

During Monk
In addition to his acting work, Shalhoub, along with the Network of Arab-American Professionals and Zoom-in-Focus Productions, established The Arab-American Filmmaker Award Competition in 2005. Arab-American filmmakers submitted screenplays, and the chosen winner was flown to Hollywood to have their screenplay produced.

He appeared with Matthew Broderick and Alec Baldwin in the 2004 Hollywood satire The Last Shot as a gruff small-time mobster with a love for movies. In 2006, he appeared in Danny Leiner's drama The Great New Wonderful as a psychologist in post-9/11 New York City. In 2007, he appeared in the horror film 1408 and on-stage off-Broadway as Charlie in The Scene.

The Marvelous Mrs. Maisel
Shalhoub stars as Jewish-American math professor Abe Weissman, father of protagonist Midge Maisel (Rachel Brosnahan), in the Emmy-winning, Amazon-produced TV comedy series The Marvelous Mrs. Maisel.

Voice work
His first two voiceover credits were as Aradesh in the original Fallout in his only non-Cars related video game credit, and Emir in one episode of the Disney animated series Gargoyles. He received a 2008 Grammy nomination in the category "Best Spoken Word Album for Children" for his narration of The Cricket in Times Square. He provided the voice of Luigi, a 1959 Fiat 500 who runs a tire shop, in the 2006 Disney/Pixar film Cars and its 2011 and 2017 sequels, Cars 2 and Cars 3, respectively, as well as 3 episodes of the short-form Cars series Tales from Radiator Springs (2013-2014) and the first episode of Cars on the Road (2022), and several video games in the franchise (2006-2011). Shalhoub voiced Splinter in the 2014 film Teenage Mutant Ninja Turtles and reprised the role in Teenage Mutant Ninja Turtles: Out of the Shadows (2016). He most recently played the character of Fred in the 2021 animated film, Rumble.

Investing 
Shalhoub is an investor in the Michelin-starred Italian restaurant, Rezdora.

Personal life

Shalhoub married actress Brooke Adams in 1992. They have worked together in several films, in one episode of Wings, and on BrainDead. Adams has appeared credited as a "Special Guest Star" in five episodes of Monk—"Mr. Monk and the Airplane", "Mr. Monk's 100th Case", "Mr. Monk and the Kid", "Mr. Monk Visits a Farm", and "Mr. Monk and the Badge".

Shalhoub and Adams appeared on Broadway together in the 2010 revival of Lend Me a Tenor. At the time of their wedding, Adams had an adopted daughter, Josie Lynn (born 1989), whom Shalhoub adopted. In 1994, they adopted another daughter, Sophie (born 1993).

Tony's brother Michael is also an actor who made multiple guest appearances on Monk. He first appears in "Mr. Monk and the Missing Granny" as a member of a disbanded radical group suspected of involvement in a kidnapping. In "Mr. Monk Bumps His Head", he plays a Wyoming beekeeper who is annoyed when a suspect crashes a car into his farm. Michael also appears in "Mr. Monk Is the Best Man" as the minister presiding at Leland Stottlemeyer's wedding.

In May 2020, Shalhoub revealed that he and his wife Brooke had tested positive for COVID-19 the previous month, remarking that "we really are all Monk now" and that they had recovered after "a pretty rough few weeks".

Filmography

Film

Television

Stage

Video games

Producer

Awards and nominations

References

External links

 
 
 
 Star File: Tony Shalhoub at Broadway.com
 Interview with Tony Shalhoub in Venice Magazine
 1st Annual Arab-American Film Maker Award 2005

1953 births
Living people
20th-century American male actors
21st-century American male actors
American male film actors
American male musical theatre actors
American male stage actors
American male television actors
American male voice actors
American people of Arab descent
American people of Lebanese descent
Television producers from New York City
Best Musical or Comedy Actor Golden Globe (television) winners
Outstanding Performance by a Lead Actor in a Comedy Series Primetime Emmy Award winners
Outstanding Performance by a Male Actor in a Comedy Series Screen Actors Guild Award winners
Male actors from Wisconsin
People from Green Bay, Wisconsin
University of Southern Maine alumni
University of Wisconsin–Green Bay alumni
Yale School of Drama alumni
Yale University alumni
Tony Award winners
Lebanese Christians
Film directors from Wisconsin
Green Bay East High School alumni